Siriella is a genus of mysid crustaceans form the family Mysidae, consisting of approximately 90 species. Found in all seas except cold Arctic and Antarctic waters, the genus is most diverse in tropics.

One of the largest and most difficult mysid genera, Siriella is divided into a number of species groups.

References

Mysida
Malacostraca genera
Taxa named by James Dwight Dana